Jarujinia is a genus of skinks. It contains one species, Jarujinia bipedalis, which is endemic to central Thailand.

References

Skinks
Monotypic lizard genera